Ounaies is a Tunisian surname. Notable people with the name include:
Ahmed Ounaies (born 1936), Tunisian politician and diplomat
Zoubeida Ounaies, Tunisian-American materials scientist